Hakan Fertelli (born February 2, 1975 in Çorum) is a Turkish volleyball player. He is 1.99m tall and plays as a middle player. He plays for Fenerbahçe Grundig. He has played over 110 times for the national team. He also played for Eczacıbaşı, Marmara Koleji, Galatasaray and Arçelik.

External links
 Player profile at fenerbahce.org

1975 births
Living people
People from Çorum
Turkish men's volleyball players
Fenerbahçe volleyballers
Eczacıbaşı volleyball players
Galatasaray S.K. (men's volleyball) players